Paobelys (Paobelė, formerly) is a village in Kėdainiai district municipality, in Kaunas County, in central Lithuania. According to the 2011 census, the village had a population of 293 people. It is located by the southeastern edge of Kėdainiai city, by the confluence of the Obelis and Nevėžis rivers, next to the crossroad of the Jonava-Šeduva (KK144) and Kėdainiai-Babtai roads. Also, the Šerkšnys river passes through the village.

History
In the beginning of the 20th century Paobelys was a small falwark.

During the Soviet era, Paobelys was subsidiary settlement of the "Spike" kolkhoz.

Demography

References

Villages in Kaunas County
Kėdainiai District Municipality